The Orangeburg Subdivision is a railroad line owned by CSX Transportation in the U.S. state of South Carolina. At its north end the line continues south from the Eastover Subdivision and at its south end the line continues south into the SCE&G Power Plant Trackage.

See also
 List of CSX Transportation lines
 Manchester and Augusta Railroad
 Cope Depot

References

External links
Dunbarton to Cope, South Carolina (Abandoned Rails)

CSX Transportation lines
Rail infrastructure in South Carolina